LIVAN is a UK-based alternative rock band founded by Greek-born singer Livan that also features guitarist Will Crewdson (Rachel Stamp, Malcolm McLaren and Johnette Napolitano) and drummer Damon Wilson (Ray Davies, Joss Stone). The band has toured with artists like Aerosmith, Alice Cooper and Peter Murphy among others.

Greek-born Livan (aka Cosmas Livanos) is the grandson of former Greek Prime Minister Panagiotis Kanellopoulos.

Members
 Livan (aka Cosmas Livanos) - vocals, guitar (2007–present)
 Will Crewdson - Lead guitar, backing vocals (2008–present)
 Jason Suttie - Keyboardist, (2007)
 John Robertson — Keyboardist, (2007–present)
 David Ryder Prangley - Bass guitar, (2007–present)
 Seven Antonopoulos - drums, (2011–present)
 Damon Wilson - drums, (2008–2011)

Discography

Singles
"Undead"
"Life Is Smiling"
"If Only" / "If Jesus Lived Today"
"King of the World"
"Happy Returns"
"Where I Bleed"
"Faces For The Future"

Studio albums

Reception
Michelle St. James (Shakefire.com) described LIVAN's music as "industrial pop punk/alt-rock" going on to say that it "sounds gritty, raw, and fun with crashing guitar and thumping bass lines".  Jack Feerick (Pop Dose) said that the "Happy Returns" album was "currently rockin’ my world down to a nub" and went on to describe the title track as sounding like "the Kaiser Chiefs meets The The with vocals by a slumming Peter Murphy".  Rob Smy (Spinner) compared LIVAN to Placebo and Nine Inch Nails.  However, Patrick Slevin (Aquarian Weekly) described LIVAN's vocals as an "acquired taste".

Writing for the Associated Press, critic Wayne Parry said "Livan defies easy categorization. His voice has the snarl of Johnny Rotten and the exaggerated bass of Iggy Pop. His shaved head evokes Rob Halford, and his stage presence evokes Freddie Mercury, clad one night in hot pink spandex and combat boots, the next in a leather fringed kilt. And he rocks."

References

External links
 

Band Nation Profile

Musical groups established in 2007
English alternative rock groups